The Worshipful Company of Fan Makers is one of the Livery Companies of the City of London. The company was incorporated by a Royal Charter in 1709. As fan making is now done by machines rather than by craftsmen, the company is no longer a trade association for fan makers. Instead, the Company functions as a charitable establishment.

The Fan Makers' Company ranks seventy-sixth in the order of precedence for Livery Companies. Its motto is Arts and Trade United.

Further reading

References

External links
 Official website

Fanmakers
Organizations established in 1709
1709 establishments in England
Ventilation fans